Ghulam Ahmad Parwez (1903–1985), widely known as Allama Parwez, was a pioneer of Quranic doctrine from pre-Independence India and later Pakistan. He attempted to rationally interpret Quranic themes, by challenging the established Sunni doctrine. Many conservative Islamic scholars criticized Parwez throughout his active years, although Parwez was well regarded among the educated demographic. Nadeem F. Paracha has called Parwez's Islam: A Challenge to Religion one of the most influential books in the history of Pakistan.

Early and personal life

Parwez was born in Batala, Punjab, in British India (Present day Punjab, India) on 9 July 1903. He migrated to Pakistan in 1947. He studied Quran and other Islamic literature. In 1934, he received a master's degree from the Punjab University. His views promoted understanding Islam in the context of modern science. Muhammad Iqbal introduced him to Muhammad Ali Jinnah. Later, Jinnah appointed him to edit the magazine Talu-e-Islam (طلوع اسلام) for the purpose of countering propaganda coming from some of the religious corners in support of Congress. He died at the age of 83.

Career 
Parwez joined the Central Secretariat of the Government of India in 1927 and soon became an important figure in the Home Department (Establishment Division). On the emergence of Pakistan he occupied the same seat in the Central Government and took pre-mature retirement as Assistant Secretary (Class I gazetted Officer) in 1955 in order to devote his entire time towards his mission. Parwez argued that his conclusions derived from the Quran were in stark contrast to both the right (capitalistic) and left (marxist) political philosophies. Before the creation of Pakistan, Parwez was recruited by Muhammad Ali Jinnah in order to help popularize the need for a separate homeland for the Muslims in South Asia. Parwez's thesis was that the organizational model of the state is the basic engine which drives the implementation of the Quran, and like Muhammad in Medina, those who wish to practice Islam, as it is defined in the Quran, are required to live in a state which submits to the laws of God, and not the laws of man.

Ideas and contributions 

Parwez was a strong believer of individual freedom, even so that this birth right almost overrides all forms of authority. Consistent with this, Parwez "adamantly opposed" slavery, claiming that it had no justifiable basis according to the Quran. He also argued that Islam challenged the "truth", validity, and very conception of "religion".

Parwez translated those verses in the Quran which are generally associated with "miracles", "angels" and "jinns" rationally as metaphors, without appealing to the supernatural. Parwez also argued in favor of Islamic socialism, seeking to reorganize all aspects of society to fit in accordance with Islamic values. He argued that "socialism best enforces Qur’anic dictums on property, justice and distribution of wealth" and that "the Prophet was a leader seeking to put an end to the capitalist exploitation of the Quraysh merchants and the corrupt bureaucracy of Byzantium and Persia", as well as advocating the application of science and agrarian reform to further economic development. Parwez has been called a "quranist" by Nadeem F. Paracha, as Parwez rejected some hadith. Paracha also claimed that Parwez approved praying Namaz in Urdu. These claims were disputed by Parwez himself while he was alive as a rumor spread by his opponents.

Translated works
 Exposition of the Holy Quran
 Human Fundamental Rights
 Dictionary Of the Holy Quran Vol 1-4
 What Is Islam
 The Quranic System of Sustenance
 Islam: A Challenge To Religion
 The Life In The Hereafter
 Islamic Way Of Living
 Letter To Tahira
 Quranic Laws
 Jihad Is Not Terrorism
 Glossary of Quranic Words
 Human and Satan
 Constitution Of Islamic State

The books written by Syed Abdul Wadud, a close friend of Parwez, based on Parwez's works and ideas:
 Conspiracies Against the Quran
 Phenomena Of Nature
 Quranocracy
 The Heavens the Earth and the Quran
 Gateway to the Quran

Publications
 Matalibul Furqaan (7 vols.)
 Lughat-ul-Quran (4 vols.)
 Mafhoom-ul-Quran (3 vols.)
 Tabweeb-ul-Quran (3 vols.)
 Nizam-e-Rabubiyyat
 Islam A Challenge to Religion (English version)
 Insaan Ne Kiya Socha (What Man Thought, A History of Human Thought)
 Islam kia he (second part of Insan ne kia socha)
 Tasawwaf Ki Haqiqat (The reality of Islamic Mysticism
 Saleem Ke Naam (3 vols.)
 Tahira Ke Naam
 Qurani Faislay (5 vols.)
 Meraj-e-Insaaniat (about Muhammad)
 Barke toor (about Mosa)
 Joe noor (about Ibrahim)
 Shola e mastoor (about Esa)
 man(o) yazdan (Me and God, about Allah in light of the Quran)
 Shahkar-e-Risalat (a biography of Caliph Omar)
 Iblis o Adam (Satan and Man)
 Jahane farda
 Mazahebe Alam ke Asmani Kitaben
 Asbab e zwal e ummat

See also
 Tolu-e-Islam
 Liberal movements within Islam
 Ideas of Ghulam Ahmed Perwez

References

External links
Books of G.A. Parwez in English (PDF format)

1903 births
1985 deaths
Leaders of the Pakistan Movement
People from Gurdaspur
Translators of the Quran into English
People from Lahore
Punjabi people
Translators of the Quran into Urdu
20th-century translators
Muslim activists
20th-century Muslim scholars of Islam
Pakistani Muslim activists
Muslim reformers